Ischnarctia cinerea is a moth of the subfamily Arctiinae. It is found in the Democratic Republic of Congo, Ethiopia, Kenya and Tanzania.

References

 Natural History Museum Lepidoptera generic names catalog

Nyctemerina